José Adílson Rodrigues dos Santos (born 12 June 1958), is a Brazilian former professional boxer. He scored 61 knockouts with 43 of those coming under 5 rounds. Rodrigues currently resides in São Paulo, São Paulo, where he is being treated for Alzheimer's disease originating from dementia pugilistica. His nickname in Brazil, Maguila, comes from the cartoon Magilla Gorilla.

Rodrigues is a former World Boxing Federation (WBF) heavyweight world champion, a former World Boxing Council (WBC) Continental Americas Heavyweight title winner, and held the South American title for 14 straight years, from 1986 to 2000.

Professional boxing record

References

External links

1958 births
Living people
People from Aracaju
Brazilian male boxers
Heavyweight boxers
Sportspeople with chronic traumatic encephalopathy
Sportspeople from Sergipe
20th-century Brazilian people
21st-century Brazilian people